Sacrament is the fifth studio album by American heavy metal band Lamb of God. Released on August 22, 2006, Sacrament debuted at No. 8 on the Billboard 200 charts with first-week sales of 63,000. The album was the top-selling heavy metal album of 2006 and received the Album of the Year award from Revolver magazine. As of 2010, it has sold over 331,000 copies in the United States, and was certified Gold by the RIAA on September 27, 2019.

The song "Pathetic" was performed live on the February 9, 2007 edition of Late Night with Conan O'Brien. This marked the first major network performance for Lamb of God. The song "Redneck" was nominated in the 2007 Grammy Awards for Best Metal Performance, but lost out to Slayer's "Eyes of the Insane".

Track listing

The deluxe edition of the album includes a bonus DVD with two videos for the track "Redneck" and a 90-minute making of the album itself, along with an Easter egg video segment entitled "Go Karts". The DVD was produced by High Roller Studios and directed by Doug Spangenberg, the same director from Lamb of God's Killadelphia DVD.

Personnel

Lamb of God
Randy Blythe – vocals
Mark Morton – lead guitar
Willie Adler – rhythm guitar
John Campbell – bass
Chris Adler – drums
 
Management
Larry Mazer, Tamera Feldman – management for Entertainment Services Unlimited
Scott Greer – marketing
Allison Hagendorf – A&R
Tim Borror – booking agent for The Agency Group 
Jeffery R. Cohen – legal for Millen, White Zelano & Branigan

Artwork
K3n Adams – art direction, design

Production
Machine – producer, mixing
Drums recorded by Josh Wilbur and Machine
Pro Tools  by Josh Wilbur and Richard Stoltz, assisted by Jim Feeney
Guitars recorded by Josh Wilbur, Ian Whalen and Machine; Additional editing and assistance by Jim Feeney; Assisted by Jeremy Miller and Brian Hoffa
Vocals recorded at The Machine Shop, Hoboken, NJ, assisted by Jim Feeney
Brian Gardner – mastering at Bernie Grundman Mastering, Hollywood, CA 
Vlado Meller – mastering on "Redneck" at Sony Studios, NYC

Charts

Certifications

References

External links
Randy Blythe interview at Ultimate-Guitar.com

2006 albums
Lamb of God (band) albums
Epic Records albums
Prosthetic Records albums
Albums produced by Machine (producer)